In Portugal, the Word of the Year poll is carried out since 2009 by the Porto Editora publishing house.

Background and methodology
Porto Editora started the Word of the Year poll to "underscore the lexical wealth and creative dynamics of the Portuguese Language". The list of candidates is produced by the publishing house through the analysis of the frequence of the usage of words (judged by both its use in mass and social media, as well as searches in Porto Editora online dictionaries), their relevance to the current goings-on, and people's suggestions on the Word of the Year website.

Until the end of November of each year, people are invited to submit their suggestions; the final vote takes place during the month of December. The Word of the Year is announced in a public ceremony in early January of the following year.

List of Words of the Year

References

External links
Palavra do Ano

2009 establishments in Portugal
Portuguese language
Portugal